The Proliga is a basketball league in Portugal organised by the Portuguese Basketball Federation (FPB). It is the second-tier basketball league in Portugal after the Portuguese Basketball League (LPB). The league was created in 2003.

Proliga Champions

Teams

Total championships

References

External links
PROLIGA - Presentation at Portuguese Basketball Federation website

2
Portugal
2003 establishments in Portugal
Professional sports leagues in Portugal
Sports leagues established in 2003